The Church of St Mary, Studley Royal, is a Victorian Gothic Revival church built in the Early English style by William Burges. It is located in the grounds of Studley Royal Park at Fountains Abbey, in North Yorkshire, England.  Burges was commissioned by the First Marquess of Ripon to build the church as a memorial church to Frederick Grantham Vyner, his brother in law.  It is one of two such churches, the other being the Church of Christ the Consoler at Skelton-on-Ure.

History

Frederick Vyner had been murdered by Greek bandits in 1870 in an event known as the Dilessi massacre. A significant ransom had been demanded, and in part collected, before his death.  His mother, Lady Mary Vyner, and his sister, Lady Ripon, used the unspent ransom to build the two churches in his memory.  Burges' appointment as architect was most likely due to the connection between his greatest patron, John Crichton-Stuart, 3rd Marquess of Bute, and Vyner, who had been friends at Oxford.  St Mary's, was commissioned in 1870 and work began in 1871. The church was consecrated in 1878.

The chestnut tree near by may be the remnant of a medieval tree-planting scheme.

Architecture and description

As at Skelton, Burges's design demonstrates a move from his favoured Early-French, to an English style. Pevsner writes of "a Victorian shrine, a dream of Early English glory". The interior is spectacular, exceeding Skelton in richness and majesty.  The stained glass is of particularly high quality.  Burges used many members of his usual architectural team: the sculpture is by Thomas Nicholls, the glass was designed by Frederick Weekes and constructed by Saunders & Co. St Mary's is Burges' "ecclesiastical masterpiece". The church is a Grade I Listed Building.

See also
Grade I listed buildings in North Yorkshire
List of churches preserved by the Churches Conservation Trust in Northern England

Notes

References

 
 

Churches completed in 1878
Studley Royal
Studley Royal
William Burges church buildings
Gothic Revival church buildings in England
Studley Royal
19th-century Church of England church buildings
Studley Royal